Tvoje lice zvuči poznato All Stars is the first All Stars season and fifth season overall of the Serbian talent show Tvoje lice zvuči poznato, which is based on the Spanish series Your Face Sounds Familiar. It aired between October 4 and December 20, 2019. It's also the first edition of the popular format in which contestants from the previous seasons compete as teams of two contestants from the same season.

Format
The show challenges celebrities (singers and actors) to perform as different iconic music artists every week, which are chosen by the show's "Randomiser". They are then judged by the panel of celebrity judges including Uroš Đurić, Dušan Alagić and Dubravka Mijatović. Each week, one celebrity guest judge joins Uroš, Dušan and Dubravka to make up the complete judging panel. Each celebrity gets transformed into a different singer each week, and performs an iconic song and dance routine well known by that particular singer. The 'randomiser' can choose any older or younger artist available in the machine, or even a singer of the opposite sex, or a deceased singer. Ten contestants from the previous seasons are grouped in five teams. The winner of each episode is a team, not contestant. Winner of the whole season is a team, too. Winner of each episode wins €1000, and winner of whole show wins €25000. All money goes to charity of winner's own choice. The show lasts 12 weeks.

Voting
The contestants are awarded points from the judges (and each other) based on their singing, Acting and dance routines. Judges give points from 2 to 12, with the exception of 11. After that, each contestant gives 5 points to a fellow contestant of their choice (known as "Bonus" points). All that points will be summed up for each team, and the best team will be winner of the episode. In week 11 (semi-final week) and in week 12 (final week), viewers also vote via text messages. In week 11 (semi-final), public votes transformed into points have added to judges' votes for semifinal week, and best team is winner of semifinal.  In final week, judges will not vote - team with most public vote will win the show.

Contestants

Series overview

Week 1 (October 4)
Guest Judge: Goca Tržan
Winner: Željko Šašić (team 5)

Bonus points
Ana gave her five points to Željko
Keba gave his five points to Željko
Ivana gave her points to Nenad
Nenad gave his five points to Ivana
Edita gave her five points to Knez
Aleksa gave his five points to Knez
Knez gave his points to Željko
Danijel gave his five points to Željko
Željko gave his five points to Danijel
Katarina gave her five points to Željko

Week 2 (October 11)
Guest Judge: Aleksandar Atanasijević
Winner: Edita Aradinović (team 4)

Week 3 (October 18)
Guest Judge: Viktor Savić
Winner: Katarina Bogićević (team 2)

Bonus points
Ana gave her five points to Katarina
Keba gave his five points to Nenad
Ivana gave her points to Keba
Nenad gave his five points to Keba
Edita gave her five points to Katarina
Aleksa gave his five points to Ana
Knez gave his points to Katarina
Danijel gave his five points to Aleksa
Željko gave his five points to Keba
Katarina gave her five points to Knez

Throwback week (October 25)
Guest Judge: Mirjana Bobić Mojsilović
Winner: Ana Kokić (team 1)
Note: Contestants were given tasks from previous seasons with assignment to out-do the original imitation.

Week 5 (November 1)
Guest Judges: Severina and Kaliopi
Winner: Aleksa Jelić (team 1)
Note: Kaliopi replaced Dubravka Mijatović in Week 5

Bonus points
Ana gave her five points to Aleksa
Keba gave his five points to Aleksa
Ivana gave her points to Aleksa
Nenad gave his five points to Aleksa
Edita gave her five points to Aleksa
Aleksa gave his five points to Ivana
Knez gave his points to Aleksa
Danijel gave his five points to Aleksa
Željko gave his five points to Knez
Katarina gave her five points to Aleksa

Week of battle (November 8)
Guest Judge: Tamara Dragičević 
Winner: Nenad Pagonis (team 4)
Note: Each two contestants performed as same singer with same song. After performance, each judge gave his vote to one of the contestant. In case of the draw, the host gave the vote of decision. Better contestant from the duel has earned five points for his (her) team. 

Bonus points
Ana gave her five points to Nenad
Keba gave his five points to Knez
Ivana gave her points to Danijel
Nenad gave his five points to Željko
Edita gave her five points to Danijel
Aleksa gave his five points to Željko
Knez gave his points to Keba
Danijel gave his five points to Ivana
Željko gave his five points to Nenad
Katarina gave her five points to Nenad

Ivana Peters, Edita Aradinović, Knez, Danijel Kajmakoski and Željko Šašić have earned five points for their teams as winners of duels.

Week 7 (November 15)
Guest Judge: Slađana Milošević 
Winner: Knez (team 5)

Week of battle (November 22)
Guest Judge: Anđelka Prpić 
Winner: Ivana Peters (team 3)
Note: Each two contestants performed as same singer with same song, or opponent in the battle.  After performance, each judge gave his vote to one of the contestant. In case of the draw, the host gave the vote of decision. Better contestant from the duel has earned five points for his (her) team. 

Bonus points
Ana gave her five points to Ivana
Keba gave his five points to Ana
Ivana gave her points to Željko
Nenad gave his five points to Ivana
Edita gave her five points to Ivana
Aleksa gave his five points to Ivana
Knez gave his points to Ivana
Danijel gave his five points to Ivana
Željko gave his five points to Ivana
Katarina gave her five points to Daniel

Aleksa Jelić, Ivana Peters, Keba, Željko Šašić and Katarina Bogićević have earned five points for their teams as winners of duels.

Week 9 (November 29)
Guest Judge: Nenad Okanović
Winner: Danijel Kajmakoski (team 3)

Bonus points
Ana gave her five points to Daniel
Keba gave his five points to Katarina
Ivana gave her points to Daniel
Nenad gave his five points to Daniel
Edita gave her five points to Daniel
Aleksa gave his five points to Keba
Knez gave his points to Ana
Danijel gave his five points to Edita
Željko gave his five points to Daniel
Katarina gave her five points to Keba

Throwback week (December 6)
Guest Judge: Danica Maksimović
Winner: Keba (team 2)
Note: Contestants were given tasks from previous seasons with assignment to out-do their best imitation from the original series.

Semi-final (December 13)
Guest Judge: Marinko Rokvić
Winner: Daniel Kajmakoski (team 3)

Bonus points
Ana gave her five points to Ivana
Keba gave his five points to Edita
Ivana gave her points to Daniel
Nenad gave his five points to Edita
Edita gave her five points to Daniel
Aleksa gave his five points to Nenad
Knez gave his points to Daniel
Daniel gave his five points to Edita
Željko gave his five points to Knez
Katarina gave her five points to Daniel

Final (December 20)

Guest Judges: Ivica Dačić & Haris Džinović     Series winners: Danijel Kajmakoski & Ivana Peters

References

Serbia
2019 Serbian television seasons